Alice may refer to: 
 Alice (name), most often a feminine given name, but also used as a surname

Literature
 Alice (Alice's Adventures in Wonderland), a character in books by Lewis Carroll
 Alice series, children's and teen books by Phyllis Reynolds Naylor
 Alice (Hermann book), a 2009 short story collection by Judith Hermann

Computers
 Alice (computer chip), a graphics engine chip in the Amiga computer in 1992
 Alice (programming language), a functional programming language designed by the Programming Systems Lab at Saarland University
 Alice (software), an object-oriented programming language and IDE developed at Carnegie Mellon
 Alice mobile robot
 Artificial Linguistic Internet Computer Entity, an open-source chatterbot
 Matra Alice, a home micro-computer marketed in France
 Alice, a brand name used by Telecom Italia for internet and telephone services

Video games 
 Alice: An Interactive Museum, a 1991 adventure game
 American McGee's Alice, a 2000 computer game
 Through the Looking Glass (video game) or Alice, a 1984 Macintosh computer game

Films 
 Alice (1982 film), a musical-fantasy film co-produced by Belgian and Polish film companies
 Alice (1988 film), a Czech fantasy film that loosely adapts Alice's Adventures in Wonderland
 Alice (1990 film), an American romantic comedy film by Woody Allen
 Alice (2002 film), a French-language LGBT-related film
 Alice (2005 film), a Portuguese drama film
 Alice (2022 film), an American crime film starring Keke Palmer
 A.LI.CE, a 2000 Japanese anime film
 Alice: Ignorance Is Bliss, a short documentary
 Alice, Sweet Alice, a 1976 American slasher film
 The Alice (film), a 2004 Australian film

Television 
Alice (American TV series), a 1976–1985 American television sitcom that was broadcast on CBS
Alice (Brazilian TV series), a 2008 Brazilian television drama series from HBO
Alice (South Korean TV series), a 2020 South Korean television drama series from SBS
Alice (miniseries), a 2009 American television miniseries that aired on Syfy
"Alice" (Star Trek: Voyager), a 1999 episode of Star Trek: Voyager
The Alice (TV series), 2005–2006 Australian drama TV series, a spin-off from the film of the same name

Music

Albums 
 Alice (Per Elisa), a 1981 album by Alice
 Alice (1984 album), a compilation album by Alice
 Alice (1986 album), a compilation album by Alice
 Alice (Tom Waits album) (2002)
 Alice (Alice Caymmi album) (2018)
 Alice (EP), a 1983 EP by The Sisters of Mercy

Artists and bands 
 Alice (singer) (born 1954), San Remo winner and Eurovision participant
 Alice (South Korean girl group)
 Alice, a Japanese band formerly led by Shinji Tanimura
 Alice, a band fronted by Dan Bárta
 Wolf Alice, English alternative rock band
 Alice Glass, Canadian singer songwriter, popular for electronic music group Crystal Castles

Songs 
 "Alice" (Tom Waits song) (2002)
 "Alice" (Moby song) (2008)
 "Alice" (Pogo song) (2007)
 "Alice" (Avril Lavigne song) (2010)
 "Alice" (Lady Gaga song), (2020)
 "Alice", a song by Stevie Nicks from  The Other Side of the Mirror
 "Alice", a song by the Noir Désir from Tostaky
 "Alice", a song by Raven-Symoné from This Is My Time
 "Alice", a song by Cocteau Twins
 "Alice" (Mylène Farmer song), a 1995 song by Mylène Farmer from Anamorphosée
 "Alice", a 1982 single by The Sisters of Mercy
 "Alice" from the Nana Kitade album titled 18: Eighteen

Places
Alice Springs, Australia, also known as "the Alice"
Alice, São Tomé and Príncipe
Alice, Eastern Cape, South Africa
Alice, Colorado, US
Alice, Missouri, US
Alice, North Dakota, US
Alice, Texas, US
Alice, West Virginia, US

Radio stations
 Radio Alice, an Italian pirate radio station
 Alice 96.1 (WQKS-FM), a radio station in Montgomery, Alabama
 Alice 107.7 (KLAL), a radio station in Little Rock, Arkansas
 Alice 97.3 (KLLC), a radio station in San Francisco, California
 Alice 105.9 (KALC), a radio station in Denver, Colorado
 Alice 97.7, the former branding of WLCE (now WQLZ), a radio station in Springfield, Illinois
 Alice 106.7 (WLLC), a former radio station in  Detroit, Michigan
 Alice 95.5 (KTOZ-FM), a radio station in Springfield, Missouri
 Alice 104.5, the former branding of WLCE (now WRFF), a former radio station in Philadelphia, Pennsylvania

Ships

 USS Alice (1864), a screw tug
 USS Alice (SP-367)
 Alice (steam tug 1897), a steam tug built in Tacoma, Washington

Other uses
 291 Alice, a Main-Belt asteroid
 Advanced Logistic & Inconsequence Cognizing Equipment, a fictional artificial intelligence in Gundam Sentinel
 Alice (spacecraft instrument), a UV imaging spectrograph on the New Horizons space probe and Rosetta spacecraft
 ALICE: A Large Ion Collider Experiment, a high-energy physics experiment 
 ALICE (accelerator), a prototype accelerator
 Alice and Bob, archetypal characters in fields such as cryptography and physics
 Alice (beetle), a genus of beetle in tribe Desmiphorini
 Alice Chess, a variant of chess
 ALICE (company), a hospitality management company
 Alice (DC Comics), a character in DC Comics
 Alice (Dilbert), a character in the Dilbert comic strip
 Alice (locomotive), a Hunslet 0-4-0 ST, used at Llanberis in North Wales
 Alice (mango), a mango cultivar that originated in south Florida
 ALICE (propellant), a rocket propellant
 All-purpose Lightweight Individual Carrying Equipment, a load-bearing system adopted as United States Army Standard A
 Alice (spacecraft instrument), an imaging spectrometer design aboard New Horizons and Rosetta unmanned space probes
 Eviation Alice, an electric aircraft
 A.L.I.C.E or Artificial Labile Intelligent Cybernated Existence in the Japanese light novel series, Sword Art Online

See also
 Alice 19th, a manga series by Yū Watase
 Alice Academy, a Japanese animated series
 Alice Corp. v. CLS Bank International, a 2014 United States Supreme Court case
 Alice Doesn't Live Here Anymore, a 1974 film by Martin Scorsese
 Alice in Chains, an alternative rock band
 Alice in Wonderland (disambiguation)
 Alice, I Think (TV series), a Canadian comedy show on The Comedy Network
 Alicia (disambiguation)
 Alicja, a Polish-language given name
 Alis (disambiguation)
 Alisa (disambiguation)
 Alise (disambiguation)
 Allis (disambiguation)
 Alliss
 Gakuen Alice (Alice Academy), a manga series written by Tachibana Higuchi
 Doralice, an American female first name
 Tropical Storm Alice, a list of tropical storms